Allegan is a type 5 H chondrite meteorite that landed in Michigan on July 10, 1899. Allegan weighed around fifty pounds after its landing. As of 1964, it was one of only seven known meteorites to land in Michigan.

Classification
It is classified as H5-ordinary chondrite.

References

See also 
 Glossary of meteoritics
 Meteorite falls
 Ordinary chondrite

Meteorites found in the United States
Geology of Michigan
1899 in Michigan